Love Affair is a studio album by Amii Stewart released in 1996.

Track listing
"How Could I Know?" (duet with Salva Campanile) – 4:20 
"Plant a New Rose in Your Heart" – 5:03 
"Summer Storm" – 4:27 
"Goodnight Tonight" – 4:50 
"Take Your Time" – 4:44 
"Been Too Long in New York City" – 6:07 
"Sweet Talk" – 4:56 
"Keep On (Doing What Ya Doing)" – 5:03 
"When I Get Over You" – 5:36 
"Living on Dreams" – 5:37 
"I Will Always Think of You" – 5:01

Personnel
 Amii Stewart – vocals

Production
 Producers: K.& B. Foreman/Romano Musumarra.

1996 albums
Amii Stewart albums